Peter Alan Mueller (born July 27, 1954 in Madison, Wisconsin) is an American former speed skater and currently a speed skating coach.

Early life
Mueller attended La Follette High School.

Skating career
Peter Mueller was the first Olympic Champion on the 1,000 m, when this distance was introduced at the 1976 Winter Olympics in Innsbruck. More international successes followed at the World Sprint Championships, where he won bronze in 1976 and silver in 1977. His last appearance as a speed skater was at the 1980 Winter Olympics in Lake Placid, where he placed 5th in the 1,000 m, 1.93 seconds behind the winning time of Eric Heiden.

Coaching 
After ending his speed skating career, Mueller became a very successful skating coach. He was the coach of Bonnie Blair when she won two gold medals at the 1992 Winter Olympics, Dan Jansen when he won gold at the 1994 Winter Olympics, Marianne Timmer (two gold medals) and Jan Bos (silver) at the 1998 Winter Olympics, and Gianni Romme (silver) at the 2002 Winter Olympics. In addition, several speed skaters winning a total of five World Sprint Championships, one World Allround Championships, and one European Allround Championships titles were also coached by him.

Since the 2003/2004 season, Mueller was the coach of the Norwegian team. He quickly added to his list of successes as a coach when, at the World Single Distance Championships of 2005 in Inzell, Even Wetten (on the 1,000 m) and Rune Stordal (on the 1500 m) became World Champions.

Mueller was fired as coach of the Norwegian team in November 2009, due to allegations of harassment of skater Maren Haugli.

Private life 
Mueller was married to American speed skater Leah Poulos, two times World Sprint Champion and three times Olympic silver medalist, and had two children. Later, he married Dutch speed skater Marianne Timmer. He and Timmer are now divorced.

An autobiography, called Op dun ijs ("On thin ice"), was published in the Netherlands in 2006.

References 

 

Footnotes

External links
 
 
 
 
 Peter A. Mueller at Team USA
 

1954 births
Living people
American male speed skaters
American autobiographers
American sports coaches
Speed skating coaches
Olympic gold medalists for the United States in speed skating
Speed skaters at the 1976 Winter Olympics
Speed skaters at the 1980 Winter Olympics
Medalists at the 1976 Winter Olympics
Sportspeople from Madison, Wisconsin
World Sprint Speed Skating Championships medalists